Ivar Sisniega Campbell (born 29 May 1958) is a Mexican modern pentathlete, politician, and businessman. He competed at the 1980, 1984 and 1988 Summer Olympics. He was formerly the head of CONADE as Sports minister under President Ernesto Zedillo from 1994 to 2000, where he created the National Youth Olympics, as well as Executive President of C.D. Guadalajara from 2002 to 2006. In 2015, he was briefly the interim President of the Pan American Sports Organization, following the death of former president Mario Vázquez Raña. His son, Pablo Sisniega, is a goalkeeper for Charlotte FC.

References

External links
 

1958 births
Living people
Mexican male modern pentathletes
Olympic modern pentathletes of Mexico
Modern pentathletes at the 1980 Summer Olympics
Modern pentathletes at the 1984 Summer Olympics
Modern pentathletes at the 1988 Summer Olympics
Mexican people of Basque descent
Mexican people of Scottish descent
Mexican people of Spanish descent